Margaret Johnson  is a British physician who is a consultant in thoracic medicine and chair of the St John & St Elizabeth Hospital. In the late 1980s, she was the first dedicated HIV doctor at the Royal Free Hospital.

Early life and education 
Johnson trained in medicine at the Royal Brompton Hospital. She completed her medical diploma in breathlessness.

Research and career 
In the late 1980s, Johnson was the first doctor in the Royal Free Hospital to specialise in HIV/AIDS. At the time, she was one of the UK's few dedicated doctors who were trying to understand HIV when one in ten patients at the Royal Free Hospital with HIV died from the condition. She developed a holistic care programme that could accommodate thousands of patients.

In 2005, Johnson was named Professor of Medicine at University College London. Johnson studied the prevalence of HIV/AIDS in women. She set up the UK's first HIV testing clinic for women. She worked with Jane Anderson on creating the BHIVA guidelines on managing women with HIV.

Johnson was medical director of the Royal Free London NHS Foundation Trust and elected Academic Vice President of the Royal College of Physicians in 2015. She served as an advisor for the Channel 4 drama It's a Sin.

Awards and honours 
 2004 Elected Chairman of the British HIV Association
 2010 Elected to the Council of the Royal College of Physicians
 2015 Elected Vice President of the Royal College of Physicians
 2022 Appointed an Order of the British Empire in the Platinum Jubilee of Elizabeth II

Selected publications

References 

Living people
20th-century British medical doctors
21st-century British medical doctors
Year of birth missing (living people)
Members of the Order of the British Empire
British pulmonologists
HIV/AIDS researchers
Academics of University College London
Royal College of Physicians